Kenneth Dale Pepiot (born April 4, 1943) is an American special effects supervisor.

Specialist in pyrotechnics and special effects, he will participate in more than forty films between 1976 and 2005.

He worked on Carrie, Scarface, Beverly Hills Cop and Planet of the Apes.

Biography
Kenneth Dale Pepiot, a native of Ohio is the descendant of Pierre Joseph Aimé Pepiot and Marie Celestine Pequignot, immigrants who arrived from Franche-Comté in France in 1836.

Nominations
 1991: Nominated for Saturn Awards with Rick Baker and Dennis Michelson for the movie Gremlins 2: The New Batch
 2000: OFTA Film Award nomination for Cast Away with Tom Hanks

Filmography 

Carrie (1976) (assistant special effects - as Kenneth Pepiot)
Mr. Billion (1977) (special effects - uncredited)
Comes a Horseman (1978) (special effects assistant)
The Great Santini (1979) (special effects)
Beulah Land (1980) (special effects director)
Heaven's Gate (1980) (special effects)
Inchon (1981) (special effects supervisor - as Kenneth Pepiot)
Jinxed! (1982) (special effects: second unit)
Safari 3000 (1982) (special effects)
Death Wish II (1982) (special effects - as Kenneth Pepiot)
Scarface (1983) (special effects)
The Right Stuff (1983) (special effects supervisor - as Kenneth Pepiot)
The River (1984) (special effects supervisor)
Beverly Hills Cop (1984) (special effects)
Invitation to Hell (1984) (TV Movie) (special effects)
The Legend of Billie Jean (1985) (special effects coordinator)
Chiller (1985) (TV Movie) (special effects coordinator)
Iron Eagle (1986) (special effects supervisor)
Band of the Hand (1986) (special effects coordinator)
*batteries not included (1987) (special effects supervisor)
Fatal Beauty (1987) (special effects supervisor - as Kenneth D. Pepiot)
Black Rain (1989) (special effects - as Kenneth D. Pepiot)
Warlock (1989) (special effects coordinator)
The Burbs (1989) (special effects supervisor)
Predator 2 (1990) (special effects supervisor)
City Slickers (1991) (special effects coordinator - as Kenneth D. Pepiot)
Sneakers (1992) (special effects coordinator)
Memoirs of an Invisible Man (1992) (special effects coordinator)
Addams Family Values (1993) (special effects coordinator - as Kenneth D. Pepiot)
Fearless (1993) (special effects coordinator)
Point of No Return (1993) (special effects coordinator)
The Shadow (1994) (special effects coordinator)
Virtuosity (1995) (special effects supervisor - as Kenneth D. Pepiot)
Tank Girl (1995) (special effects coordinator)
The Glimmer Man (1996) (special effects coordinator)
Executive Decision (1996) (special effects coordinator - as Kenneth D. Pepiot)
Small Soldiers (1998) (special effects coordinator)
Sphere (1998) (special effects supervisor)
Cast Away (2000) (special effects supervisor - as Kenneth D. Pepiot)
The Adventures of Rocky & Bullwinkle (2000) (special effects coordinator - as Kenneth D. Pepiot)
Planet of the Apes (2001) (special effects coordinator)
Red Dragon (2002) (special effects coordinator - as Kenneth D. Pepiot)
Shoot or Be Shot (2002) (special effects supervisor: second unit)
Hollywood Homicide (2003) (special effects coordinator - as Kenneth D. Pipiot)
Flight of the Phoenix (2004) (special effects technician)
Be Cool (2005) (special effects coordinator)

References

External links
 

1943 births
Living people
Special effects people
People from Ohio